Katıverelim Rakıyı Da Şaraba Katıverelim (Mesud Bugün Gönüller) is a Turkish folkloric tune tsifteteli.

See also
Leb alev lebler alev

References

Turkish music
Turkish-language songs
Turkish folk songs
Songwriter unknown
Year of song unknown